The men's competition in the lightweight (– 69 kg) division was held on 21 September 2010.

Schedule

Medalists

Records

Results

New records

References
Page 34

- Mens 69 kg, 2010 World Weightlifting Championships